King Alfred's Tower is a folly in Somerset, England, on the edge of the border with Wiltshire, on the Stourhead estate. The tower stands on Kingsettle Hill and belongs to the National Trust. It is designated as a Grade I listed building.

Henry Hoare II planned the tower in the 1760s to commemorate the end of the Seven Years' War against France and the accession of King George III, and it was erected near the site of Egbert's Stone, where it is believed that Alfred the Great, King of Wessex, rallied the Anglo-Saxons in 878 before the Battle of Edington. The tower was damaged by an  aeroplane in 1944 and restored in the 1980s.

The  triangular tower has a hollow centre and is climbed by means of a helical staircase in one of the corner projections. It has a statue of King Alfred and a dedication inscription.

Location
The tower stands near the site of 'Egbert's Stone', where it was said that Alfred the Great, King of Wessex, rallied the Saxons in May 878 before the important Battle of Edington (historically known as the battle of Ethandun), where the Danish army, led by Guthrum the Old was defeated. It is the start of the Leland Trail, a  footpath which runs south-west to Ham Hill Country Park.

History
The project to build the tower was conceived in 1762 by the banker Henry Hoare II (1705–1785). The tower was intended to commemorate the end of the Seven Years' War against France and the accession of King George III.

In 1765 Henry Flitcroft, a Palladian architect, designed the tower. Building began in 1769 or early 1770, and was completed in 1772 at a cost estimated to be between £5,000 and £6,000. There may have been some delay due to difficulty in obtaining the bricks. In addition to the commemorative function, the tower was also intended to serve as an eye-catcher for those touring the parkland of the Stourhead Estate.

The tower was damaged in 1944 when a Noorduyn Norseman aeroplane crashed into it in fog, resulting in the death of the five American aircrew and damage to the uppermost . It was designated as a Grade I listed building in 1961. Restoration work in 1986 included the use of a Wessex helicopter to lower a  piece of masonry onto the top. The statue of King Alfred was also restored at this time, including the replacement of his missing right forearm.

Architecture

Each of the three corners of the triangular structure has a round projection. The centre of the tower is hollow, and to stop birds from entering the space a mesh has been added at roof level. The viewing platform, which has a crenellated parapet and offers a view over the surrounding countryside, is reached by a 205-step spiral staircase at the corner furthest from the entrance. The brick tower has Chilmark stone dressings and is surmounted by an embattled parapet.

The south-east face of the tower has a Gothic-arched entrance door, a statue of King Alfred, and a stone panel bearing an inscription (see below). This is the face that most visitors see first when walking from Stourhead garden or from the nearby car park.

Inscription

Around the Stourhead estate are several inscriptions. The one on the tower was drafted in 1762 and installed in 1772. The stone tablet above the door on the east face of the tower reads:

ALFRED THE GREAT
AD 879 on this Summit
Erected his Standard
Against Danish Invaders
To him We owe The Origin of Juries
The Establishment of a Militia
The Creation of a Naval Force
ALFRED The Light of a Benighted Age
Was a Philosopher and a Christian
The Father of his People
The Founder of the English
MONARCHY and LIBERTY

In popular culture
The tower is mentioned in Thomas Hardy's poem "Channel Firing" (written in April 1914) as a place "far inland".

See also
Scrabo Tower, County Down

References

External links

Unofficial website, last updated in 2015, via Internet Archive

Towers in Somerset
Monuments and memorials in Somerset
Grade I listed buildings in South Somerset
National Trust properties in Somerset
Tourist attractions in Somerset
Folly towers in England
Towers completed in 1772
Alfred the Great
Observation towers in the United Kingdom
Grade I listed towers
Grade I listed monuments and memorials

it:Stourhead#Alfred's Tower